Justice Long may refer to:

Charles D. Long, associate justice of the Michigan Supreme Court
Virginia Long, associate justice of the Supreme Court of New Jersey